The Shrinking of Treehorn is an upcoming American computer-animated film directed by Ron Howard from a screenplay by Rob Lieber, and produced by Animal Logic and Imagine Entertainment. The film based on the children's book of the same name by Florence Parry Heide.

Production
On June 20, 2019, it was announced that Ron Howard would direct the first animated film from Imagine Entertainment. The animation would be done by Animal Logic and the film was originally going to be distributed by Paramount Pictures.

Release
The film was originally scheduled to be released in the United States on November 10, 2023, by Paramount Pictures. However, on May 16, 2022, it was announced that the film had been acquired by Netflix.

References

External links
 

Upcoming films
Upcoming Netflix original films
2020s American animated films
2020s English-language films
American computer-animated films
Upcoming English-language films
Animated films based on children's books
Animated films about children
Films about size change
Films set in 2023
Imagine Entertainment films
Animal Logic films